Battery I, 1st Regiment of United States Artillery was a field artillery battery of the United States Army between 1821 and 1901 that notably served in the Union Army during the American Civil War.

Service history

Early history 
The company was organized in June 1821 at Fort Constitution, New Hampshire under the command of Captain Fabius Whiting.

It was posted at various East Coast installations in garrison through 1836, when the company was deployed to Fort Mitchel, Alabama and was sent into the field during the Creek War of 1836.

Shortly thereafter, the company was deployed to Florida, where it joined the campaign during the Second Seminole War from 1836 until 1838.

Equipped as a field artillery battery, the unit participated in the Mexican–American War from 1847 until 1848, joining the campaign under the command of Captain John Bankhead Magruder during the siege of Vera Cruz and engaged at the battles of Cerro Gordo, Contreras, Churubusco, Molino del Rey, and Mexico City.

In 1850, Battery I was ordered to the Pacific Coast to take post at San Diego, California; the unit remained in California through 1855, when it was ordered to join the United States Boundary Survey en route to Texas.

In 1857, the company returned to the Atlantic Coast at Fort Adams, Rhode Island.

The battery was ordered to Fort Leavenworth, Kansas with much of the Regular Army in 1859, where it remained until January 1861 before moving to Washington, D.C.

Civil War 
Upon the outbreak of the American Civil War, Captain Magruder resigned his commission and joined the Confederacy. Command of Battery I was given to Captain James B. Ricketts, who led the battery at the Battle of Bull Run; Ricketts was severely wounded in action and captured, and command soon passed to Lieutenant Edmund Kirby Jr., who led the battery through the Peninsula Campaign, Antietam, and Fredericksburg before he was killed at the Battle of Chancellorsville.

Lieutenant George Woodruff led the company at the Battle of Gettysburg, and was killed in action.

Lieutenant Tully McCrea briefly commanded the battery after Gettysburg, and was replaced by Lieutenant Francis "Frank" Sands French.

In October 1863, Captain Ricketts (absent since July 1861) was replaced with Captain Alanson Merwin Randol; Randol, who had commanded Battery E & G, 1st U.S. of the Horse Artillery Brigade since 1862, trained and refitted Battery I as a horse artillery battery, and in April 1864 it was merged with Battery H, 1st U.S. to create Battery H & I, 1st U.S.

Battery H & I served for the remainder of the war as a horse artillery battery, typically attached to the Cavalry Division. It was present during the Wilderness Campaign of 1864, including the Battle of Cold Harbor in June 1864. 

Captain Randol left the battery for West Point in August 1864, and later accepted a volunteer commission; for the rest of the war, the company was commanded by its lieutenants.

Post-war 
After the war, the battery was posted on garrison duty across the United States: at Fort Brown, Texas, 1865–1869; at Fort Trumbull, Connecticut, 1869–1870; at Fort Delaware, Delaware, 1870; at Fort Wood, New York, 1870–1872; at Key West Barracks, Florida, 1872–1875; at Fort Warren, Massachusetts, 1875–1881.

In November 1881, the company was transferred to the Department of the Pacific: it was posted at Fort Canby, Washington Territory, 1881–1882, Fort Stevens, Oregon, 1882–1883, Fort Canby, Washington Territory, 1883–1884, Fort Alcatraz, California, 1884–1886, the Presidio, California, 1886–1890.

In 1890, the battery returned to the Atlantic Coast: it was posted at Fort Hamilton, New York, 1890–1896, Fort Monroe, Virginia, 1896–1898, and Fort Morgan, Alabama, 1898–1901.

The company was commanded by Captain William Montrose Graham from April 1872 until July 1879, Captain John C. White from July 1879 until October 1883, Captain Richard Shaw from October 1883 until June 1896, and Captain Robert Patterson from June 1896 until February 1901.

In February 1901, the regimental artillery service was dissolved and reorganized as the United States Artillery Corps: Battery I, 1st U.S. was converted to the Eighth Company, Coast Artillery.

Detailed Civil War service
Moved to Washington, D.C., January 7–29, 1861, and served duty there until July. Advanced on Manassas, Va., July 16–21, 1861. First Battle of Bull Run July 21. Moved to Poolesville, Md., August 7–15. Duty there and at Edward's Ferry until March 1862. Ball's Bluff October 21, 1861. Edward's Ferry October 22. Ordered to the Virginia Peninsula March 1862. Siege of Yorktown April 5-May 4. Battle of Seven Pines, May 31-June 1. Seven Days Battles before Richmond June 25-July 1. Peach Orchard and Savage Station July 29. White Oak Swamp and Glendale June 30. Malvern Hill July 1. Moved to Alexandria, Va., August 16–23. Maryland Campaign September 6–22. Battle of Antietam September 16–17. At Harpers Ferry until October 30. Movemed to Falmouth, Va., October 30-November 17. Battle of Fredericksburg December 11–15. "Mud March" January 20–24, 1863. At Falmouth until April. Chancellorsville Campaign April 27-May 6. Battle of Chancellorsville May 1–5. Gettysburg Campaign June 11-July 24. Battle of Gettysburg July 1–3. Advance to line of the Rapidan September 13–17. Bristoe Campaign October 9–22. Bristoe Station October 14. Advance to line of the Rappahannock November 7–8. Mine Run Campaign November 26-December 2. Campaign from the Rapidan to the James. Battle of the Wilderness May 5–7. Battle of Spotsylvania Court House May 8–21. Battle of North Anna May 23–26. Battle of Totopotomoy Creek May 28–31. Battle of Cold Harbor June 1–7. Gaines's Mill, Salem Church, and Haw's Shop June 2. Sheridan's Trevilian Raid June 7–24. Trevilian Station June 11–12. Black Creek or Tunstall Station and White House or St. Peter's Church June 21. St. Mary's Church June 24. At Light House Point June 29-July 27. At Camp Barry, Washington, D.C. until September. Arthur's Swamp September 29. Poplar Springs Church September 29-October 1. Wyatt's Road October 1. Boydton Plank Road October 27–28. Warren's Raid on Weldon Railroad December 7–12. Dabney's Mills February 5–7, 1865. Appomattox Campaign March 28-April 9. Dinwiddie Court House March 30–31. Five Forks April 1. Namozine Church April 3. Paine's Cross Roads April 5. Sailor's Creek April 6. Appomattox Court House April 9. Surrender of Lee and his army. Moved to Washington, D.C., May. Grand Review of the Armies May 23.

Notable Commanders
 Captain John Bankhead Magruder
 Captain James Brewerton Ricketts – wounded in action and captured at the First Battle of Bull Run
 1st Lieutenant Edmund Kirby Jr. – in command in Ricketts' absence, mortally wounded at the  Battle of Chancellorsville
 1st Lieutenant George Augustus Woodruff – replaced Kirby, mortally wounded at the Battle of Gettysburg
 1st Lieutenant Tully McCrea – replaced Woodruff commanding battery at Gettysburg after Woodruff was mortally wounded; he briefly commanded the battery after the battle
 Captain Alanson Merwin Randol – succeeded Ricketts, October 1863 to August 1864, June 1865 to 1872.
 Captain William Montrose Graham

See also

 List of United States Regular Army Civil War units
 1st Air Defense Artillery Regiment

References
 Dyer, Frederick H. A Compendium of the War of the Rebellion (Des Moines, IA: Dyer Pub. Co.), 1908.
Attribution

External links
 Battery I, 1st U.S. Light Artillery monument at Gettysburg Battlefield

United States Regular Army Civil War units and formations
U
Military units and formations established in 1861
Military units and formations disestablished in 1865